John Howson Rust Jr. (born May 21, 1947) is an American lawyer and politician from Fairfax County, Virginia, who twice served in the Virginia General Assembly and currently as the county's Commissioner of Accounts.

Early life and education
Although born in a hospital Washington, D.C., in 1947, Rust is a lifelong Fairfax County resident. Three generations of his family practiced law in northern Virginia, and his father (also John H. Rust Jr.) served as Fairfax's mayor as well as a delegate to Virginia's 1956 Constitutional Convention, and his grandfather John W. Rust served in the Senate of Virginia. Rust attended grammar school during Massive Resistance and graduated from Fairfax High School after its integration. He then went to Charlottesville to attend the University of Virginia, receiving a bachelor's degree in 1969 and in 1972 a J.D. degree from its law school, after serving on the board of editors of the Virginia Law Review and winning election to the Order of the Coif. Following graduation and during the Vietnam War, Rust served in the U.S. Army.

Career

Following his admission to the Virginia Bar and military service, Rust worked as a lawyer in Fairfax in the family law firm, Rust & Rust, which in 1982 merged with another law firm to become McCandlish, Lillard, Rust & Church. From 1974 to 1978, as had his father several times, including immediately after the town's incorporation as a city in 1962, Rust was the Fairfax city attorney. He currently serves as counsel to the Fairfax School Board.

Virginia delegate

Rust first became one of Fairfax County's delegates in the Virginia House of Delegates (a part-time position) in 1979 (to what was then the 18th House of Delegates district), and won re-election in 1981 (to what became the 50th House of Delegates district) and thus served from 1980 to 1982. However, his second re-election attempt failed when Rust narrowly lost to Stephen E. Gordy in the Republican Party primary in what had become the 37th Virginia House of Delegates district following court-required adoption of single member districts.

Rust won a special election for the 37th district seat in 1996, and then a full two-year term in November 1997. Rust retained his seat in the 1999 elections, having been named Legislator of the Year by the Virginia Treasurers' Association, Tech Ten Legislator and Business Leader of the Year  (all three in 1998) as well as Fairfax County Chamber of Commerce Chamber Champion (1999). Following the 2000 United States Census, Rust helped redraw electoral boundaries. Nonetheless, Rust lost his seat in the next election, defeated by Democrat Chap Petersen in 2001, and again in the 2003 election rematch.

Commissioner of Accounts 
Appointed Commissioner of Accounts for the 19th Judicial Circuit in February 2006. Rust's legal practice included estate administration services, the preparation of income and estate tax returns; and trust administration services, including maintenance, investment and distribution of trust accounts. He also provided estate planning services, including tax planning and the preparation of wills and trusts. A member of the Fairfax, Virginia and American Bar Associations, the Virginia State Bar and the Virginia Trial Lawyers Association, Rust is qualified to practice before the United States Supreme Court, the United States Court of Appeals for the Fourth Circuit, the United States District Court for the Eastern District of Virginia, the United States Bankruptcy Courts for the Eastern and Western Districts of Virginia and in all Virginia courts.

Virginia Resource Authority 
Governor Robert McDonnell appointed Rust to the VRA Board in 2012. He served on the board's Portfolio Risk Management Committee and the Legislative Committee, as well as chaired the Strategic Planning Committee.

Cardinal Financial Corporation and Patriot Bankshares 
After helping to found Cardinal Financial Corporation, Rust became its initial chairman of the board of directors and remained as a director (1997–2009), including time as the board's vice-chairman. Rust also was the founding chairman of First Patriot Bankshares Corporation and served on its board from 1987 to 1997.

Personal life 
Rust married the former Susan Mary Byrne and has three sons, J.W., Tom and Bob.

References

1947 births
Living people
Politicians from Fairfax, Virginia
Politicians from Washington, D.C.
University of Virginia School of Law alumni
University of Virginia alumni
Virginia Republicans
Virginia lawyers
20th-century American lawyers
21st-century American lawyers
Virginia city attorneys
20th-century American politicians
21st-century American politicians